Sir Thomas Eversfield (1614–1649) was an English politician who sat in the House of Commons of England from 1640 to 1644. He supported the Royalist side in the English Civil War.

Eversfield was the son of John Eversfield of Hollington, East Sussex. His father and three brothers were also Members of Parliament for Hastings.

References

 

1654 deaths
English MPs 1640–1648
1614 births